= Hong Bang Middle School =

Location
- Ho Chi Minh City, Vietnam
- Coordinates: 10.7556°N 106.6607°E

Information
- Established: 1933

Hong Bang Secondary School (Trường THCS Hồng Bàng) is a middle school in Ho Chi Minh City, Vietnam. It was established in 1933 by French colonialists as a pension school for French children studying with local Vietnamese students. The school is one of the oldest and most well-known public middle schools in Ho Chi Minh City. Students are from grade 6 to 9.
